Kim Kwon (born Kim Keon-woo on May 16, 1989) is a South Korean actor. He played minor roles in television dramas such as Secret Love Affair (2014), Heard It Through the Grapevine (2015), and Marry Me Now (2018). He rose to prominence upon playing a lead role in He is Psychometric (2019) and has since played another lead role in the American remake series Leverage (2019).

Filmography

Films

Television series

Web series

Awards and nominations

References

External links

 

1989 births
Living people
21st-century South Korean male actors
South Korean male television actors
South Korean male film actors